Viviane Jacques (born 1977) is a Brazilian handball player. She was born in Rio de Janeiro. She competed at the 2000 Summer Olympics in Sydney, where the Brazilian team placed 8th, and also at the 2004 Summer Olympics in Athens and at the 2008 Summer Olympics in Beijing.

References

External links

1977 births
Living people
Sportspeople from Rio de Janeiro (city)
Brazilian female handball players
Brazilian expatriate sportspeople in Spain
Olympic handball players of Brazil
Handball players at the 2000 Summer Olympics
Handball players at the 2004 Summer Olympics
Handball players at the 2008 Summer Olympics
Handball players at the 2003 Pan American Games
Handball players at the 2007 Pan American Games
Pan American Games medalists in handball
Pan American Games gold medalists for Brazil
Medalists at the 2007 Pan American Games
20th-century Brazilian women
21st-century Brazilian women